The 1927 Northwestern Wildcats team represented Northwestern University during the 1927 Big Ten Conference football season. In their first year under head coach Dick Hanley, the Wildcats compiled a 4–4 record (2–3 against Big Ten Conference opponents) and finished in a tie for sixth place in the Big Ten Conference.

Schedule

References

Northwestern
Northwestern Wildcats football seasons
Northwestern Wildcats football